Zhu Qingyu (c. 797?–?) was a Chinese poet of the middle Tang dynasty. His birth name was Zhu Kejiu; Qingyu was his courtesy name.

He received a Jinshi degree in the imperial examination in the mid-820s.

Biography 
Zhu Kejiu was probably born around 797. His courtesy name, by which he is commonly known, was Qingyu.

During the Baoli era (825–827, Traditional Chinese: 寶曆, Simplified Chinese: 宝历, pinyin: bǎolì) he passed the imperial examination, receiving his Jinshi degree.

His year of death is not known.

Poetry 

He had a close relationship with the poet Zhang Ji, who highly praised his poetry.

References

Cited works

External links 
Books of the Quan Tangshi at the Chinese Text Project that include collected poems of Zhu Qingyu:
Book 514
Book 515

790s births
Year of death unknown
9th-century Chinese poets
Tang dynasty poets
Three Hundred Tang Poems poets

zh:朱可久